Cyperus lateriticus is a species of sedge that is native to parts of the west coast of Africa.

See also 
 List of Cyperus species

References 

lateriticus
Plants described in 1966
Flora of Senegal
Flora of Guinea